Violenza sul lago ("Violence in the lake") is a 1954 Italian melodrama film written and directed by Leonardo Cortese.

Cast 
Lia Amanda as Rossana
Erno Crisa  as Marco
Peter Trent as  Dr. Berti
Carlo Hintermann as  Sergio
Virna Lisi as  Laura
Giacomo Rondinella as  Stefano
Patrizia Della Rovere  as Mirella
Mario Brega

References

External links

1954 films
Italian drama films
Films directed by Leonardo Cortese
1954 drama films
Italian black-and-white films
1950s Italian films
1950s Italian-language films